Cuerito is pig skin (pork rind) from Mexican cuisine, Venezuelan cuisine and Spanish cuisine. Cuero is the Spanish-language word for skin, leather or hide, so cueritos means "little skins". They are usually pickled in vinegar (cueritos de vinagre) and can be made with a spicy sauce. The vinegar can be seasoned with pineapple, dulce macho (piloncillo), cloves, peppercorns, chile de árbol and oregano. There are also family recipes.

Cueritos are used to make a type of cemita and can be used in other dishes like tostadas. Cueritos are sometimes served in a glass with strips of the pickled pork rind alongside a slaw of cabbage, cucumber, lime, and chile sauce. The Mexican street food (antojito) known as "tostilocos" are made by slicing nacho-flavored tostito chips vertically and topping them with cucumber, cueritos, lime juice, Valentina hot sauce, chamoy, tajín (seasoning) chili powder, salt and "Japanese peanuts" (peanuts encased in a crunchy brown flour shell).

In Acatlán, Hidalgo the feast in honor of the Archangel Michael is held from 20–29 September, with religious events, traditional dances and traditional foods such as cueritos made with chili pepper sauce and varieties of pulque.

Pickling differentiates cueritos from chicharrón, which is fried pork skin. In Spain the chicharrón is the rind with fat still attached and cuerito is a rind with no fat attached. In Mexico, chicharrón is the cuerito or pig skin fried to a crisp like cracklings in the southern states and cueritos is soft, deep fat fried pig skin, chopped and used for tacos.

In Mexico, natural, uncured cueritos, usually the thick pig skin without the fat attached, are always combined with "macisa", solid or thick meat, in carnitas which is deep fat fried pig parts sold for tacos. The tacos are served with a choice of meats, chopped, in 1 or 2 soft corn tortillas, covered with chopped cilantro and onion, and the choice of a hot chilli sauce. They are a popular street food that can be found in public markets, most carnicerías, or meat stores, and many restaurants.

Types of cuerito
Cuerito Grueso is thick pigskin from the pig ears, face and feet. Cuerito Delgado is from the pig's body and is thinner. Encurtidos are pickled vegetables, peanuts and potatoes. Other subtleties of the varieties of epidermis and pig fat have also been noted.

See also
 Pork rind

References

Mexican cuisine
Pork dishes
Spanish cuisine
Venezuelan cuisine